TRAPPIST-1g, also designated as 2MASS J23062928-0502285 g and K2-112 g, is an exoplanet orbiting around the ultra-cool dwarf star TRAPPIST-1  away from Earth in the constellation Aquarius. It was one of four new exoplanets to be discovered orbiting the star using observations from the Spitzer Space Telescope. The exoplanet is within the optimistic habitable zone of its host star. It was found by using the transit method, in which the dimming effect that a planet causes as it crosses in front of its star is measured.

The second most distant known planet in its system, TRAPPIST-1g is a planet larger than Earth yet less dense, meaning it likely hosts some form of water.

Physical characteristics

Mass, radius, and temperature 
TRAPPIST-1g has roughly 115% the mass and radius of Earth, though its density is only 4.186 g/cm3, about 76% of Earth's. Based on mass-radius calculations and its distant location relative to its host star (0.047 AU) and the fact that the planet only receives 25.2% of the stellar flux that Earth does, the planet is likely covered by a thick ice envelope if an atmosphere does not exist.

Atmosphere
TRAPPIST-1g could have a global water ocean or an exceptionally thick steam atmosphere. According to a simulation of magma ocean-atmosphere interaction, TRAPPIST-1g is likely to retain a large fraction of primordial steam atmosphere during the initial stages of evolution, and therefore today is likely to possess a thick ocean covered by atmosphere containing hundreds of bars of abiotic oxygen.

Water
On 31 August 2017, astronomers at the Hubble Space Telescope reported the first evidence of possible water content on the TRAPPIST-1 exoplanets.

Host star 
The planet orbits an (M-type) ultracool dwarf star named TRAPPIST-1. The star has a mass of 0.08 M☉ and a radius of 0.11 R☉. It has a temperature of 2550 K. The age of the star is about  billion years old. In comparison, the Sun is 4.6 billion years old and has a temperature of 5778 K. The star is metal-rich, with a metallicity ([Fe/H]) of 0.04, or 109% the solar amount. This is particularly odd as such low-mass stars near the boundary between brown dwarfs and hydrogen-fusing stars should be expected to have considerably less metal content than the Sun. Its luminosity (L☉) is 0.05% of that of the Sun.

The star's apparent magnitude, or how bright it appears from Earth's perspective, is 18.8, too dim to be seen with the naked eye.

Orbit 
TRAPPIST-1g orbits its host star with an orbital period of about 12.354 days and an orbital radius of about 0.0451 times that of Earth's (compared to the distance of Mercury from the Sun, which is about 0.38 AU). This is in the outer limit of TRAPPIST-1's theoretical habitable zone. The orbit of TRAPPIST-1g has an eccentricity of 0.00208, much lower than that of Earth and the lowest in its system. Its orbit varies by only about 41,000 kilometers (compared to about 5 million km for Earth), meaning the planet's climate is likely very stable. It is in a 3:2 orbital resonance with TRAPPIST-1h and a 3:4 resonance with TRAPPIST-1f.

See also
 List of extrasolar candidates for liquid water
 List of transiting exoplanets
 List of potentially habitable exoplanets
 List of nearest terrestrial exoplanet candidates
 TRAPPIST-1d
 TRAPPIST-1e

References

Exoplanets discovered in 2017
Near-Earth-sized exoplanets
Near-Earth-sized exoplanets in the habitable zone
Transiting exoplanets
TRAPPIST-1
Aquarius (constellation)